"It's All Going to Pot" is a song written by Buddy Cannon, Larry Shell and Jamey Johnson. The song was recorded by Willie Nelson and Merle Haggard featuring Johnson. It was released on April 20, 2015, as the single to the album Django & Jimmie.

Overview
The song was written by producer Buddy Cannon, Larry Shell and Jamey Johnson. Recorded by Willie Nelson and Merle Haggard, it featured a cameo by Johnson. It became the single for Nelson and Haggard's 2015 collaboration album Django & Jimmie.

The single was released on April 20, 2015, or 4/20, a date significant for its implication in cannabis culture. A video of the song was released on the same day, featuring Haggard and Nelson recording the song in the studio. A behind-the-scenes video of the recording of the song was released, featuring both singers and Cannon discussing the lyrics of the song.

Chart performance

References

2015 songs
Merle Haggard songs
Willie Nelson songs
Songs written by Jamey Johnson
Songs written by Buddy Cannon
Song recordings produced by Buddy Cannon
2015 singles
Songs written by Larry Shell
Songs about cannabis